Lance Allan Ito (born August 2, 1950) is a retired American judge best known for presiding over the criminal trial for the O. J. Simpson murder case, held in the Los Angeles County Superior Court in 1995.

Early life and career 

Ito was born in Los Angeles to Jim Ito and Toshi Ito. Both his parents were kept in internment camps for Japanese Americans with their families during the Second World War. Ito was enrolled in Sunday School at the Mount Hollywood Congregational Church.  Ito attended John Marshall High School, where he was student body president and received the Scholar Athlete award in 1968. He earned his bachelor's degree with honors from the University of California, Los Angeles in 1972, and his J.D. degree from the then University of California, Berkeley, Boalt School of Law in 1975. He then joined the Los Angeles district attorney's office in 1977, working in the hardcore gang unit and the organized crime and terror unit, among others.

In 1981, he married Margaret Ann York, the first woman to attain the rank of Deputy Chief in the Los Angeles Police Department and that department's highest ranking woman officer when she retired in 2002. The two met while at an Eagle Rock murder scene.

Republican Governor George Deukmejian appointed Ito to the Municipal Court in 1987, and then elevated him to Superior Court in 1989.

In 1991, Ito determined that Soon Ja Du was not a flight risk in the case of the killing of Latasha Harlins, and denied the deputy district attorney's request to revoke Du's bail.

In 1992 he handled the indictment against Lyle and Erik Menendez. The criminal trial was presided over by Stanley Weisberg.

Charles H. Keating, Jr. trial
In 1992, he presided over the trial of financier Charles H. Keating Jr. Keating's ensuing ten-year sentence was later overturned on appeal because Ito had neglected to instruct the jury to determine whether Keating intended to defraud investors. It was the prosecution's position that Keating was liable as a matter of strict liability.

O. J. Simpson murder trial

Ito presided over the 1995 murder trial of O. J. Simpson, at which Simpson was acquitted. His decision to allow television coverage of the trial was controversial, and Ito faced criticism for seeming to enjoy the press and for allowing too many sidebars and recesses.

During the trial, the prosecution requested that Ito recuse himself when it came to light that his wife, Margaret York, had been detective Mark Fuhrman's superior officer in the past. Fuhrman had been called to testify by the prosecution regarding his discovery of evidence in the case. During cross-examination, Fuhrman claimed that he had not used racial epithets to refer to African-Americans during the last ten years. Simpson's defense team unearthed tapes in which Fuhrman had used racial epithets as recently as 1988, and they wished to introduce them as evidence to prove that Fuhrman had perjured himself, in order to discredit his testimony. However, in the tapes, Fuhrman disparages York's appearance and suggests that she used her gender to advance in the police force. The prosecution requested that Ito step down because they felt that derogatory remarks toward his wife might bias Ito against Fuhrman, though prosecutors later withdrew the request out of fear that it would result in a mistrial.

Post-Simpson trial career
Ito declined to give interviews regarding the Simpson murder trial because ethical guidelines for California trial-court judges forbid commenting on pending matters or matters likely to come before the courts. He has noted his disbelief that public interest in the trial extended through the "turgid" DNA section of the trial. He has used his status to work on issues of judicial reform, such as increasing the number of interpreters and enforcing rules for foreign-national defendants in the court. Los Angeles County announced in April 2012 that Ito's courtroom, along with 55 others, would be closed due to budget cuts. Ito retired in 2015.

Popular culture

 Ito was portrayed by voiceover artist Billy West on the Howard Stern Show. West's spot-on impression was a highlight of the show during the trial.  

 Ito was portrayed on Saturday Night Live, first by Mike Myers, and then, following Myers' departure from the show, by Mark McKinney. 
 The Tonight Show with Jay Leno had a recurring skit called "The Dancing Itos" featuring five bearded Asian-American dancers.
 Kenneth Choi portrayed Ito in the 2016 series The People vs. O. J. Simpson.
 A caricature of Ito appears in the Pinky and the Brain episode "Of Mouse and Man" and the Freakazoid! episodes "Dexter's Date", "The Freakazoid", and "Virtual Freak".
 Ken Jeong dressed as Judge Ito for a 1995 Halloween party on the ABC series Dr. Ken.
 In the Manhunt episode "USA vs. Theodore J. Kaczynski", Ito is mentioned by the judge of Unabomber’s trial, as he claims to not be like him.

See also
List of Asian American jurists

References

External links
 

1950 births
American jurists of Japanese descent
California Democrats
California state court judges
Lawyers from Los Angeles
Living people
O. J. Simpson murder case
Superior court judges in the United States
UC Berkeley School of Law alumni
University of California, Los Angeles alumni